Erquinghem-Lys is a commune situated in the Nord department in northern France.

It is part of the Métropole Européenne de Lille. Erquinghem is one of a series of villages on the river Lys established by the Viking Rikiwulf in 880 AD at the time of the invasion led by Godfrid, Duke of Frisia: Racquinghem, Reclinghem, Rekkem and Rijkegem (the latter two now in West Flanders - Belgium).

Erquinghem-Lys has been twinned with Skipton, North Yorkshire,  England since 24 October 2009.

Population

Heraldry

See also
Communes of the Nord department

References

External links
 Erquinghem-Lys official website

Erquinghemlys
French Flanders